Colin Roberts (16 September 1933 – September 2017) was an English professional footballer who played as a wing half.

Career
Roberts was born in Castleford. He played football for Altofts Colliery before signing for Bradford Park Avenue in 1951. He made his debut in the Football League in the 1953–54 season, and over that and the next two seasons made 75 League appearances for Park Avenue. After returning to non-league football with Frickley Colliery, Roberts spent two seasons back in the league with Bradford City, making 57 further appearances.

References

1933 births
2017 deaths
Sportspeople from Castleford
English footballers
Association football wing halves
Altofts F.C. players
Bradford (Park Avenue) A.F.C. players
Frickley Athletic F.C. players
Bradford City A.F.C. players
English Football League players